The tabar (also called tabarzin, which means "saddle axe" [in persian], Modern Turkish: teber) is a type of battle axe. The term tabar is used for axes originating from the Ottoman Empire, Persia, India and surrounding countries and cultures. As a loanword taken through Iranian Scythian, the word tabar is also used in most Slavic languages as the word for axe (e.g. ).

Persia 
The tabarzin (saddle axe) (sometimes translated "saddle-hatchet") is the traditional battle axe of Persia (Iran). It bears one or two crescent-shaped blades. The long form of the tabar was about seven feet long, while a shorter version was about three feet long.  What makes the Persian axe unique is the very thin handle, which is very light and always metallic. The tabarzin was sometimes carried as a symbolic weapon by wandering dervishes (Muslim ascetic worshippers). The word tabar for axe was directly borrowed into Armenian as tapar from Middle Persian tabar, as well as into Proto-Slavic as "topor" (*toporъ), the latter word known to be taken through Scythian, and is still the common Slavic word for axe.

India 
During the 17th and 18th centuries, the tabar battle axe was a standard weapon of the mounted warriors of Punjab, Sikh Khalsa army and what is now modern day India and Pakistan. Made entirely of metal or with a wood haft, it had a strongly curved blade and a hammer-headed poll and was often decorated with scroll work. Sometimes a small knife was inserted in the tabar's hollow haft.

Arabia 
According to Adam Metz's "Islamic Civilization in the Fourth Century of the Hegira," the tabar was frequently not only a weapon used by police chiefs (Sahib al-Shurta), but also a mark of office for them.

Gallery

See also
 Battle axe

References

Sources

Medieval weapons
Indo-Persian weaponry